SARC may refer to:

Health
 Sexual Assault Referral Centre, directed by Dr. Catherine White at Saint Mary's Hospital, Manchester, England
 Sexual Assault Referral Centers, founded as a response to rape during the Sierra Leone Civil War
 Sexual Assault/Spouse Abuse Resource Center, an anti-sexual assault organization in the United States
 Singapore Association for Retarded Children
 Special Amphibious Reconnaissance Corpsman, a type of medic of the United States Navy
 Syrian Arab Red Crescent

Other uses
 Doctor Fernando Piragine Niveyro International Airport (ICAO: SARC), Argentina
 Sarcoma Alliance for Research Through Collaboration, a nonprofit consortium of physicians who conduct collaborative clinical trials; see Evofosfamide
 School Accountability Report Card, used in the U.S. state of California; e.g. Richmond High School
 Sonic Arts Research Centre, a Networked music performance research group at Queen’s University Belfast, Northern Ireland
 Student Alumni Relations Cell, a student organisation of Indian Institute of Technology, Bombay, India
 Sudanese Awakening Revolutionary Council, a militant group in Sudan

See also
 Proto-oncogene tyrosine-protein kinase Src, pronounced Sarc
 SAARC, South Asian Association for Regional Cooperation